is a Japanese voice actor from Hokkaido affiliated with the talent agency I'm Enterprise. Honored at the 6th Seiyu Awards for Best New Actor in 2012 and the 10th Seiyu Awards for Best Lead Actor in 2016, he is best known for being the voice of Kirito from Sword Art Online, Bell Cranel from Is It Wrong to Try to Pick Up Girls in a Dungeon?, Sorata Kanda from The Pet Girl of Sakurasou, Sora from No Game No Life, Arata Kasuga/Astral Trinity from Trinity Seven, Sōma Yukihira from Food Wars!: Shokugeki no Soma, Fūtarō Uesugi in The Quintessential Quintuplets, Masamune Izumi from Eromanga Sensei, Petelgeuse Romanée-Conti from Re:Zero − Starting Life in Another World, and Inosuke Hashibira from Demon Slayer: Kimetsu no Yaiba. As of June 17, 2019, he is the current official Guinness World Record holder for the most unique sound bites provided by a voice actor, exceeding 10,000 words in Is It Wrong to Try to Pick Up Girls in a Dungeon?: MEMORIA FREESE.

Biography

While aspiring to become an auto mechanic in his senior year of high school, he searched for a voice actor school in Hokkaido, but went to Tokyo after receiving advice that it would be difficult to succeed without going to a school in the capital. After graduating from Yoyogi Animation Gakuin while working as a newspaper scholarship student, he joined the Japan Narration Actors Institute. After auditioning in 2009, Matsuoka became a member of I'm Enterprise agency. In the same year, he made his debut as AKX20000 in Eden of the East.

In 2011, he starred in the role of Narumi Fujishima in Heaven's Memo Pad for the first time, and won the Best Rookie Actors at the 6th Seiyu Awards in 2012.

In 2012, he started voicing on Kirito in Sword Art Online.

At the 1st Aniradi Awards on March 21, 2015, he along with fellow radio personality Ai Kayano in "No Radio No Life; Gamer Brothers will start doing radio." won the "RADIO OF THE YEAR Best Radio Award" and the "BEST RETURN HOPE RADIO Revival Hope Radio Award."

On March 12, 2016, he won the Best Actor in a Leading Role at the 10th Seiyu Awards.

On June 17, 2019, he appeared on YouTube channel "Danmachi FES 2019-TV Anime Danmachi II and Dan Memo 2nd Anniversary Is It Wrong to Have an Event Together? Special-Public Live Broadcast !!" where Guinness World Record certified him for the most unique sound bites provided by a voice actor, exceeding 10,000 words in Is It Wrong to Try to Pick Up Girls in a Dungeon?: MEMORIA FREESE.

On October 2, 2021, as a collaboration project between Sword Art Online Progressive: Aria of a Starless Night movie and the Yomiuri Giants, he appeared in the Giants game with Ayana Taketatsu and Hiroki Yasumoto, and became a pitcher for the opening ceremony. Matsuoka continued to collaborate during the match with a cap shuffle game with Taketatsu and an announcement with Yasumoto to liven up the venue.

Filmography
Anime

|}

Films

Video gamesGrand Chase Dimensional Chaser Global as Lass IsoletFinal Fantasy XIV: Endwalker as Fandaniel/Amon/HermesTales of Arise as LawGranblue Fantasy as Chat Noir, BaldrDream Meister and the Recollected Black Fairy as ItsukiSword Art Online: Infinity Moment as Kirito/Kazuto KirigayaShiratsuyu no Kai as Tsukamoto RyoutaGlass Heart Princess as Doumyouji GaiGlass Heart Princess : Platinum as Doumyouji GaiPhantasy Star Nova as SeilUnder Night In-Birth as ChaosOctopath Traveler as TherionSword Art Online: Hollow Fragment as Kirito/Kazuto KirigayaDengeki Bunko: Fighting Climax as Kirito/Kazuto KirigayaTears to Tiara 2 as HamilMahouka Koukou no Rettousei: Out of Order as Masaki IchijōMugen Souls Z as AceChaos;Child as Takuru MiyashiroDigimon Story: Cyber Sleuth as Male ProtagonistChaos Rings III as Male ProtagonistSword Art Online: Lost Song as Kirito/Kazuto KirigayaSword Art Online: Hollow Realization as Kirito/Kazuto KirigayaSword Art Online: Memory Defrag as Kirito/Kazuto Kirigaya, himself (live action)Accel World vs. Sword Art Online: Millennium Twilight as Kirito/Kazuto Kirigaya, Graphite Edge (uncredited)Sword Art Online: Fatal Bullet as Kirito/Kazuto KirigayaSword Art Online: Integral Factor as Kirito/Kazuto KirigayaI-Chu as Hikaru OriharaNights of Azure as Professor AlucardFairy Fencer F as ZenkeOtogi: Spirit Agents as HijiriThe Alchemist Code as ReimeiDragalia Lost as Hope, Emile (uncredited)Brown Dust as SetoFire Emblem Heroes as HridThe Idolmaster SideM as Shouta MitaraiOur World is Ended as Iruka No. 2Extraordinary One as GarudaIs It Wrong to Try to Pick Up Girls in a Dungeon?: MEMORIA FREESE as Bell Cranel, Argonaut, and ErebusArena of Valor as Lu Bu (Japanese Server), Kirito (SAO Skin) & Inosuke Hashibira (KNY Skin)Arknights  as AreneAtelier Lulua: The Scion of Arland as Nicodemus David DieterOnmyoji as KorokaPunishing: Gray Raven as LeeNamu Amida Butsu! -UTENA- as Yakushi NyoraiGenshin Impact as XiaoCookie Run: Kingdom as Herb CookieSword Art Online: Alicization Lycoris as Kirito/Kazuto KirigayaA Certain Magical Index: Imaginary Fest as Kakeru KamisatoCaptain Tsubasa: Rise of New Champions as Juan DíazCaptain Tsubasa: Dream Team as Tomeya AkaiRune Factory 5 as LykaPokémon Masters EX as IngoAlchemy Stars as SylvaSword Art Online: Last Recollection as Kirito/Kazuto KirigayaMaster Detective Archives: Rain Code as Yomi Hellsmile

Original net animation (ONA)The Way of the Househusband (2021) as Pet CatBastard!! -Heavy Metal, Dark Fantasy- (2022) as LarsGaiken Shijō Shugi (2022) as Keisuke HasegawaGamera: Rebirth (TBA) as Joe

Original video animation (OVA)Code Geass: Boukoku no Akito as Yukiya NaruseThe Comic Artist and His Assistants as Yūki Aito Hori-san to Miyamura-kun as Izumi MiyamuraHybrid Child as TsukishimaStar-Myu: High School Star Musical as Akira UgawaBōkyaku Battery as Junpei Chihaya

Drama CDsGal☆Gun as Motesugi TenzouSenaka Awase no Koi as Nikaido FumitoHitorijime Boyfriend as Ohshiba KensukeBathroom Yori Ai o Komete 2 as Ogura TomohikoBrother Shuffle! as HajimeGosan no Heart as Miki ToshihisaMegumi to Tsugumi as Yamada TsugumiTamayura as Asakura MichitadaShuuen no Shiori Project -Shuuen Re:act- (終焉-Re:act-) as E-kiYoru to Asa no Uta as AsaichiKono Ore ga Omae Nanka Suki na Wakenai as Taisei FujimaSmells Like Green Spirit as Futoshi MishimaRequiem of the Rose King (2016, 2017) as Prince EdwardKakkou no Yume (2018) as Yuuzi SenoSeirei Gensouki as Rio (Amakawa Haruto)L'étranger series as Mio ChibanaMo Dao Zu Shi (2020) as Nie HuaiSang/Jou KaisouTashiro-kun, Kimi tte Yatsu Wa. (2021) as Yuuta EbiharaTearmoon Empire  (2022, 2023) as Abel Remno

Voice-over comicsNisekoi as Raku Ichijō

Live action
 Voice II (2021) as Hentai Belt (voice)
 Kamen Rider Geats (2022) as the Vision Driver and Laser Raise Riser (voice)

DubbingChristine (2019 4K Ultra HD edition) as Arnold "Arnie" Cunningham (Keith Gordon)Hard Hit as Jin-woo (Ji Chang-wook)The Hurricane Heist as Will Rutledge (Toby Kebbell)Lookism as Park Hyung Seok/Keisuke HasegawaMechamato as MechaBotReady Player One'' as Sho (Philip Zhao)

References

External links
  
 

1986 births
Living people
Best Actor Seiyu Award winners
I'm Enterprise voice actors
Japanese male video game actors
Japanese male voice actors
Male voice actors from Hokkaido
Seiyu Award winners
21st-century Japanese male actors